Jehanzeb Jamaldini is a Pakistani politician and a former member of Senate of Pakistan, affiliated with Balochistan National Party (BNP-M). Dr. Jehanzeb got his MBBS degree from Dow Medical College in 1978. He is Central Sceretary General of Balochistan National Party (Mengal). He was elected from Balochistan on General Seat of Senate of Pakistan. His tenure is from March, 2015 to March, 2021.

Political career 
He was the chairperson of Committee on Committee on Rules of Procedure and Privileges. He was also member of following standing committees.
 The Drafting Committee of the Committee of the Whole
 Business Advisory Committee
 The Performance of PIA
 Bipartisan Special Oversight Committee
 Ethics
 Interior and Narcotics Control
 Human Rights
 Problem of Less Developed Areas
 The Project of China-Pak Economic Corridor

Personal life 
His son Sangat Jamaldini died on 8 August 2016 in a blast in Civil Hospital Quetta.

References 

Politicians from Balochistan, Pakistan